Cochylimorpha centralasiae is a species of moth of the family Tortricidae.

It is found in Central Asia, within the Altai Krai of Russia, and Margelan of the Fergana Region in Uzbekistan.

C
Moths of Asia
Insects of Central Asia
Altai Krai
Fergana Region
Moths described in 1964
Taxa named by Józef Razowski